Thung Khru is a khwaeng (subdistrict) of Thung Khru District, in Bangkok, Thailand. In 2020, it had a total population of 68,222 people.

References

Subdistricts of Bangkok
Thung Khru district